Mowbray Mountain is a census-designated place in Hamilton County, Tennessee, United States. Its population was 1,615 as of the 2010 census.

Demographics

References

Census-designated places in Hamilton County, Tennessee
Census-designated places in Tennessee